The Jacksonville Symphony Youth Orchestras, or JSYO, is a youth orchestra based in Jacksonville, Florida.

Overview
Founded in 1993 under the Jacksonville Symphony Association, the JSYO enrolls more than 400 young musicians between the ages of 7 and 22, who are admitted through competitive auditions. The JSYO has six levels of ensembles – two full symphonies and four levels of string ensembles – that vary by repertoire and technical advancement. Regional satellite sites now offer beginning to intermediate ensembles for students musicians in the early stages of their musical instruction.
Jump Start Strings – 1st year beginning string students, conducted by David Hwanmin Song
Foundations Strings  – 2nd year beginning string students, conducted by Rose Francis and John Wieland
Encore Strings – young string students, conducted by Helen Morin
Premiere Strings – advancing string students, conducted by Helen Morin
Repertory Orchestra – intermediate full symphony orchestra, conducted by Deanna Tham
Philharmonic – advanced full symphony orchestra, conducted by Deanna Tham
Chamber Music Program – available to qualified Philharmonic and Repertory musicians
Communities in Schools Program – available at select elementary schools, conducted by John Wieland And Patrice Evans

Musical Instruction

The JSYO offers the following opportunities:

 In-depth study of classical repertoire
 Direction by professional conductors: as of 2018, the current conductor is Deanna Tham.
 Exposure to nationally recognized soloists through their affiliation with the Jacksonville Symphony
 Coaching sessions with Jacksonville Symphony musicians
 Outreach performances in the community
 Chamber ensemble training and performances
 Young Artists Competition
 Performances in the Jacoby Symphony Hall

Performances

Usually, a JSYO season consists of three main concerts and a chamber ensemble concert given by members of the Philharmonic Orchestra.  The season culminates with a joint performance with the Jacksonville Symphony at the Major/Minor Concert, bringing teachers and students to the stage together for a side-by-side performance. Winners of the JSYO Young Artists Competition have the honor of soloing at this concert.

External links

American youth orchestras
Music of Jacksonville, Florida
Tourist attractions in Jacksonville, Florida
1993 establishments in Florida
Musical groups established in 1993
Youth organizations based in Florida
Orchestras based in Florida